Robert Huber (born 20 February 1937) is a German biochemist and Nobel laureate. known for his work crystallizing an intramembrane protein important in photosynthesis and subsequently applying X-ray crystallography to elucidate the protein's structure.

Education and early life

He was born on 20 February 1937 in Munich where his father, Sebastian, was a bank cashier. He was educated at the Humanistisches Karls-Gymnasium from 1947 to 1956 and then studied chemistry at the Technische Hochschule, receiving his diploma in 1960. He stayed, and did research into using crystallography to elucidate the structure of organic compounds.

Career
In 1971 he became a director at the Max Planck Institute for Biochemistry where his team developed methods for the crystallography of proteins.

In 1988 he received the Nobel Prize for Chemistry jointly with Johann Deisenhofer and Hartmut Michel. The trio were recognized for their work in first crystallizing an intramembrane protein important in photosynthesis in purple bacteria, and subsequently applying X-ray crystallography to elucidate the protein's structure. The information provided the first insight into the structural bodies that performed the integral function of photosynthesis. This insight could be translated to understand the more complex analogue of photosynthesis in cyanobacteria which is essentially the same as that in chloroplasts of higher plants.

In 2006, he took up a post at the Cardiff University to spearhead the development of Structural Biology at the university on a part-time basis.

Since 2005 he has been doing research at the Center for medical biotechnology of the University of Duisburg-Essen.

Huber was one of the original editors of the Encyclopedia of Analytical Chemistry.

Awards and honours
In 1977 Huber was awarded the Otto Warburg Medal. In 1988 he was awarded the  Nobel Prize and in  1992 the Sir Hans Krebs Medal. Huber was elected a member of Pour le Mérite for Sciences and Arts,  in 1993  and  Foreign Member of the Royal Society (ForMemRS) in 1999. His certificate of election reads:

Personal life
Huber is married and has four children.

References

External links
 

1937 births
Living people
Foreign associates of the National Academy of Sciences
German biochemists
Scientists from Munich
Nobel laureates in Chemistry
Foreign Members of the Royal Society
Recipients of the Pour le Mérite (civil class)
German Nobel laureates
Studienstiftung alumni
Technical University of Munich alumni
Academic staff of the Technical University of Munich
Academics of Cardiff University
Max Planck Society people
Members of the European Academy of Sciences and Arts
Foreign Fellows of the Indian National Science Academy
Grand Crosses with Star and Sash of the Order of Merit of the Federal Republic of Germany
Researchers of photosynthesis
Max Planck Institute directors